Warwickshire (abbreviated Warks) is a county in the West Midlands region of England. The county town is Warwick, and the largest town is Nuneaton. The county is famous for being the birthplace of William Shakespeare at Stratford-upon-Avon and Victorian novelist George Eliot, (born Mary Ann Evans), at Nuneaton. Other significant towns include Rugby, Leamington Spa, Bedworth, Kenilworth and Atherstone. The county offers a mix of historic towns and large rural areas. It is a popular destination for international and domestic tourists to explore both medieval and more recent history.

The county is divided into five districts of North Warwickshire, Nuneaton and Bedworth, Rugby, Warwick and Stratford-on-Avon.

The current county boundaries were set in 1974 by the Local Government Act 1972. The historic county boundaries included Coventry, Sutton Coldfield and Solihull, as well as much of Birmingham and Tamworth.

Geography
Warwickshire is bordered by Leicestershire to the northeast, Staffordshire to the northwest, Worcestershire and the West Midlands to the west, Northamptonshire to the east and southeast, Gloucestershire to the southwest and Oxfordshire to the south. The northern tip of the county is only  from the Derbyshire border.

The majority of Warwickshire's population live in the north and centre of the county. The market towns of northern and eastern Warwickshire were industrialised in the 19th century, and include Atherstone, Bedworth, Coleshill, Nuneaton, and Rugby. Major industries included coal mining, textiles, engineering and cement production, but heavy industry is in decline, being replaced by distribution centres, light to medium industry and services. Of the northern and eastern towns, Nuneaton and Rugby (as the birthplace of rugby football) are best known outside of Warwickshire. The prosperous towns of central and western Warwickshire, including Royal Leamington Spa, Warwick, Stratford-upon-Avon, Kenilworth, Alcester, Southam and Wellesbourne, harbour tourism, gaming and services as major employment sectors.

The south of the county is largely rural and sparsely populated, and includes a very small area of the Cotswolds, at the border with northeast Gloucestershire. The plain between the outlying Cotswolds and the Edgehill escarpment is known as the Vale of Red Horse. The only town in the south of Warwickshire is Shipston-on-Stour.

There are no cities in Warwickshire since both Coventry and Birmingham were incorporated into the West Midlands county in 1974 and are now metropolitan authorities in themselves. According to the 2011 United Kingdom census, the largest towns (+20,000 pop.) in Warwickshire were: Nuneaton (pop. 81,900), Rugby (70,600), Leamington Spa (49,500), Bedworth (32,500), Warwick (30,100), Stratford (25,500) and Kenilworth (22,400)

Arden and Felden 
Much of western Warwickshire, including the area now forming part of Coventry, Solihull and Birmingham, was covered by the ancient Forest of Arden(most of which was cut down to provide fuel for industrialisation). Thus the names of a number of places in the central-western part of Warwickshire end with the phrase "-in-Arden", such as Henley-in-Arden, Hampton-in-Arden and Tanworth-in-Arden. The remaining area, not part of the forest, was called the Felden – from fielden - and is now an undulating and agricultural landscape, through which the rivers Avon and Leam flow.

Historic county boundaries
Areas historically part of Warwickshire include Coventry, Solihull, Sutton Coldfield, and some of Birmingham including the city centre, Erdington, Aston and Edgbaston. These areas also became part of the metropolitan county of West Midlands (and Sutton Coldfield became part of Birmingham) following local government re-organisation in 1974.

In 1986 the West Midlands County Council was abolished and Birmingham, Coventry, and Solihull became effective unitary authorities. However, the West Midlands county name has not been altogether abolished, and still exists for ceremonial purposes. Since 2016, it has been used as part of the West Midlands Combined Authority, with powers over transport, economic development and regeneration. Some organisations, such as Warwickshire County Cricket Club, which is based in Edgbaston, in Birmingham, observe the historic county boundaries.

The flag of the historic county was registered in October 2016. It is a design of a bear and ragged staff on a red field, which is long associated with the county.

Coventry is effectively in the centre of the Warwickshire area, and still has strong ties with the county. Coventry and Warwickshire are sometimes treated as a single area and share a single Chamber of Commerce, Local Enterprise Partnership and BBC Local Radio Station (BBC Coventry & Warwickshire).

Coventry was administered separately from the rest of Warwickshire between 1451 and 1842. It formed the County of the City of Coventry,  a county corporate from 1451. In 1842 the county corporate of Coventry was abolished and remerged with the rest of Warwickshire.

The town of Tamworth was historically divided between Warwickshire and Staffordshire, but since 1888 has been fully in Staffordshire.

Green belt

Warwickshire contains a large expanse of green belt area, surrounding the West Midlands and Coventry conurbations, and was first drawn up from the 1950s. All the county's districts contain some portion of the belt.

Places of interest 

Anne Hathaway's Cottage
Arbury Hall
Battle of Edgehill
The Belfry
Brinklow Castle
British Motor Museum
Burton Dassett Hills
Caldecotte Park
Charlecote Park
Charlecote Water Mill
Chesterton Windmill
Compton Verney House
Compton Wynyates
Coombe Abbey
Coombe Country Park
Coughton Court
Coventry Canal
Draycote Water
Grand Union Canal
Guy Fawkes House
Hartshill Hayes County Park
Hatton Country World
Jephson Gardens
Kenilworth Castle
King Edward VI School
Kingsbury Water Park
Ladywalk Reserve
Lunt Roman Fort
Lord Leycester Hospital
Lowsonford
Mary Arden's House
Midland Air Museum
Newbold Quarry Park
Nuneaton Museum & Art Gallery
Oxford Canal
Ragley Hall
River Avon
Rollright Stones
Royal Pump Rooms
Royal Shakespeare Theatre
Rugby Art Gallery and Museum
Rugby School
Ryton Pools Country Park
Shakespeare's Birthplace
Shakespeare's New Place
St Nicholas Park
The Forest Hermitage
University of Warwick
Warwick Castle
Warwick School
Webb Ellis Rugby Football Museum
Wellesbourne Wartime Museum

Economy 
Warwickshire has a strong and growing economy with the automotive industry being a major contributor. In the north, BMW’s Hams Hall plant employs over 1,000 people, while Jaguar Land Rover and Aston Martin Lagonda have headquarters, including a giant advanced production creation centre, at Gaydon in the south.

Warwickshire is also establishing a growing reputation as a global hub of the video game industry. One of Britain's oldest still-running game studios, Codemasters, has operated out of Southam for decades; the greater "Silicon Spa" area, including Southam, Royal Leamington Spa and Warwick, is now home to dozens of game studios which employ a combined total of over 2,000 highly skilled people, equating to more than 10% of the UK's games development workforce.

Increasingly the region is establishing itself as one of the leading areas in battery technology with major developments announced in 2021 that include a £130 million UK Battery Industrialisation Centre (UKBIC) based in Coventry.

Tourism is also a key area of employment with country parks, rural areas and historic towns across the county. It generates a total business turnover of over £1 billion to the local economy and supports almost 20,000 jobs.

Settlements 

Main Warwickshire settlements:
 Bedworth
 Kenilworth
 Nuneaton
 Leamington Spa
 Rugby
 Stratford-upon-Avon
 Warwick

Smaller settlements include:
Alcester
Arley
Atherstone
Baddesley Ensor
Bidford-on-Avon
Bulkington
Coleshill
Henley-in-Arden
Kingsbury
Long Lawford
Polesworth
Shipston-on-Stour
Southam
Studley
Water Orton
Wellesbourne
Whitnash

History

Warwickshire came into being as a division of the kingdom of Mercia in the early 11th century. The first reference to Warwickshire was in 1001, as Wæringscīr, named after Warwick. The prefix wara- is the genitive plural of the Old English noun waru, which means "those that care for, watch, guard, protect, or defend". It was used as an endonym by both Goths and Jutes.  The suffix -wick is an Old English cognate (-wic) for the Latin word for village, vicus. Near Warwick are the villages of Long Itchington and Bishop's Itchington along the River Itchen.

During the Middle Ages Warwickshire was dominated by Coventry, which was at the time one of the most important cities in England due to its importance in the textiles trade. Warwickshire played a key part in the English Civil War, with the Battle of Edgehill and other skirmishes taking place in the county. During the Industrial Revolution Warwickshire became one of Britain's foremost industrial counties, with the large industrial cities of Birmingham and Coventry within its boundaries.

Boundary changes

1844: The Counties (Detached Parts) Act transferred a township to, and two parishes from, the county.
1888: Those parts of the town of Tamworth lying in Warwickshire were ceded to Staffordshire.
1891: Harborne became part of the County Borough of Birmingham and thus was transferred from Staffordshire to Warwickshire by the Local Govt. Bd.'s Prov. Orders Conf. (No. 13) Act, 54 & 55 Vic. c. 161 (local act).
1891: The district of Balsall Heath, which had originally constituted the most northerly part of the Parish of King's Norton in Worcestershire, was added to the County Borough of Birmingham, and therefore Warwickshire, on 1 October 1891.
1909: Quinton was formally removed from Worcestershire and incorporated into the County Borough of Birmingham, then in Warwickshire, on 9 November 1909.
1911: The Urban District of Handsworth, in Staffordshire, and the Rural District of Yardley along with the greater part of the Urban District of King's Norton and Northfield, both in Worcestershire, were absorbed into Birmingham, and thus Warwickshire, as part of the Greater Birmingham Scheme on 9 November 1911.
1928: Perry Barr Urban District was ceded to Birmingham from Staffordshire.
1931: The boundaries between Gloucestershire, Warwickshire, and Worcestershire were adjusted by the Provisional Order Confirmation (Gloucestershire, Warwickshire and Worcestershire) Act which transferred 26 parishes between the three counties, largely to eliminate exclaves. The town of Shipston-on-Stour was gained from Worcestershire and several villages, including Long Marston and Welford-on-Avon, from Gloucestershire.
1974: Under The Local Government Act 1972, Birmingham, Coventry, Solihull and Sutton Coldfield were ceded to the new West Midlands county, with Sutton Coldfield becoming part of Birmingham.

Local government
Like most English shire counties, Warwickshire has a two-tier structure of local government. with a county council, and five districts each with their own district or borough councils. These districts are: North Warwickshire, Nuneaton and Bedworth, Rugby, Stratford, and Warwick (see map). The county and district councils are responsible for providing different services.

Atherstone is the headquarters of the North Warwickshire district, Nuneaton is headquarters of the Nuneaton and Bedworth District and Leamington Spa is the headquarters of the Warwick district.

Warwickshire County Council, based in Warwick is elected every four years. The last election was the held on 6 May 2021 and resulted in a Conservative majority. The county council operates a cabinet-style council. The county council is made of 57 councillors, who decide upon the budget and appoints the council leader. The council leader selects 8 councillors and together they form the cabinet. The Leader assigns portfolios on which cabinet members make decisions. Key decisions are made by the whole cabinet while others are made only by the portfolio holders for relevant areas.

In addition many small towns and villages have their own town council or parish council as the most local tier of local government.

Warwickshire is policed by the Warwickshire Police. The force is governed by the elected Warwickshire Police and Crime Commissioner.

Proposed local government reorganisation
In August 2020 Warwickshire County Council put forward proposals for the five district and borough councils in the county to be abolished and replaced with a single county-wide unitary authority. This prompted a backlash from the district and borough councils who commissioned their own report, which argued in favour of Warwickshire being split into two unitary authorities, one for the north of the county, covering the current districts of North Warwickshire, Nuneaton and Bedworth and Rugby, and one for the south of the county, covering Warwick and Stratford districts. In September 2020, it was agreed that both proposals would be sent for consideration to the Secretary of State for Housing, Communities and Local Government.

Education

In the state sector, children start school in the school year in which they turn five. They stay at primary school for seven years (although this varies even within the county, as some people have previously gone for four years and then spent another four years at a 'middle school') until they are eleven. Warwickshire is one of 36 local authorities in England to still maintain the grammar school system in two districts: Stratford-on-Avon and Rugby. In the final year of primary school, children are given the opportunity of sitting the 11-plus exam to compete for a place at one of the 5 grammar schools: Stratford-upon-Avon Grammar School for Girls; King Edward VI School, a boys' school from year 7–11 with a mixed Sixth-Form; Lawrence Sheriff Grammar School for Boys; Rugby High School for Girls and Alcester Grammar School (mixed). The Warwickshire 11+ selection test consists of two papers, each containing a mixture of verbal reasoning, numerical reasoning and non-verbal reasoning multiple-choice questions.

Warwickshire contains four colleges of further education: North Warwickshire & Hinckley College, King Edward VI Sixth Form College (K.E.G.S) in Nuneaton, Stratford-upon-Avon College and the Warwickshire College Group an institution made up of six main separate colleges that have merged (Leamington Centre, Rugby Centre, Moreton Morrell Centre, Pershore College, Henley-in-Arden Centre and the Trident Centre in Warwick).

There are also six independent senior schools within the county, namely: Rugby School, Warwick School, Princethorpe College, Kingsley School, Arnold Lodge School (both in Leamington Spa), and the King's High School For Girls (in Warwick).

A number of the Warwickshire grammar and independent schools have historical significance. King Edward VI School, Stratford-upon-Avon still uses 13th century school buildings and is the likely school of William Shakespeare, Rugby School was founded in 1567 and Warwick School was founded c. 914 AD, which makes it the oldest surviving boys' school in the country. Rugby School is one of nine schools that were defined as the "great" English public schools by the Public Schools Act 1868, and is a member of the Rugby Group. Rugby School, Princethorpe College and Warwick School are HMC schools, with the Headmaster from each school attending the Headmasters' and Headmistresses' Conference.

There are no universities per se in Warwickshire, though the University of Warwick forms part of the border with Warwickshire on the southern edge of the city of Coventry. Some areas of the University of Warwick are within the boundaries of Warwickshire including Lakeside Village and Warwick Business School The university has a small campus near Wellesbourne which houses the Warwick Horticultural Research Centre and an Innovation Centre.

Transport

Roads
Several major motorways run through Warwickshire. These include:

The M40 motorway, which connects London to Birmingham, runs through the centre of the county, and serves Leamington Spa, Warwick and Stratford.
The M6 motorway, which connects northwestern England and the West Midlands to the M1 motorway (and then on to London), runs through the north of Warwickshire, and serves Rugby, Nuneaton and Bedworth on its way to Birmingham.
The M69 Coventry to Leicester motorway, which serves Nuneaton.
Other motorways pass briefly through Warwickshire including the M45 (a short spur south of Rugby connecting to the M1), the southern end of the M6 Toll, and the M42, which passes through the county at several points.

Other major trunk routes in Warwickshire include the A45 (Rugby-Coventry-Birmingham and east into Northamptonshire route). The A46 (connects the M40 to the M6 via Warwick, Kenilworth and Coventry), the A452 (Leamington to Birmingham route) and the A5 runs through Warwickshire passing Nuneaton between Tamworth and Hinckley. Also the A444 goes through Nuneaton and Bedworth.

Rail

Two major railway lines pass through Warwickshire.

Rail services are provided by Chiltern Railways and West Midlands Trains (Birmingham to Leamington only). There are also two branches off the Chiltern line, one from Leamington to Coventry, and another from Hatton near Warwick to Stratford.

The West Coast Main Line (WCML) runs through Warwickshire. At  the WCML splits into two parts, one runs west through to Coventry and Birmingham, and the other the Trent Valley Line runs north-west towards  and the north-west of England.

Other railway lines in Warwickshire include the Birmingham-Nuneaton section of the Birmingham to Peterborough Line, which continues east of Nuneaton towards Leicester and Peterborough.

This line used to continue southwards to Cheltenham but is now a dead-end branch. Stratford also has direct rail services to London via the branch line to Warwick (mentioned earlier).

Until 2018 the only major town in Warwickshire without a station was Kenilworth. The Leamington to Coventry line passes through the town, but the station was closed in the 1960s as part of the Beeching cuts.  A replacement station opened in April 2018, with an hourly service to Coventry and to Leamington provided by West Midlands Trains.

The new High Speed 2 (HS2) line is being constructed through Warwickshire although, as it is a long-distance trunk route, there will be no stations in the county. It will pass south of Southam, then between Kenilworth and Coventry, before running into the West Midlands towards Birmingham.

Air
Coventry Airport is located in the Warwickshire village of Baginton.

Canals and waterways

Canals and navigable waterways in Warwickshire include:
The Coventry Canal which runs through the north of the county from Coventry through Bedworth, Nuneaton, Atherstone, and Polesworth, and then onwards to Tamworth.
The Ashby-de-la-Zouch Canal passes briefly through Warwickshire from a junction with the Coventry Canal at Bedworth.
The Oxford Canal, which runs from near Coventry and then eastwards around Rugby, and then through the rural south of the county towards Oxford.
The Grand Union Canal, which runs through Leamington and Warwick and onwards to Birmingham.
The restored Saltisford Canal Arm is close to the centre of Warwick, and is now a short branch of the Grand Union Canal. The arm is the remains of the original terminus of the Warwick and Birmingham Canal and dates back to 1799. 
The Stratford-upon-Avon Canal which runs from the Grand Union west of Warwick to Stratford, where it joins the Avon.
The River Avon runs through Warwickshire on a south-west to north-east axis, running through Stratford, Warwick and Rugby. There have been proposals to extend the Avon navigation  to Warwick. However, as of 2019, these plans look unlikely to proceed.

Sports

Cycling 
Warwickshire’s rural roads, canal towpaths and historic towns are increasingly popular with cycling enthusiasts. Its reputation as a major cycling destination has been bolstered in recent years having hosted a stage of the Women’s Tour since 2016 and the Men’s Tour of Britain in 2018 and 2019.

In 2022, St Nicholas Park in Warwick will host the Elite Men’s and Women’s Road Race as part of the Commonwealth Games taking place in Birmingham.

Association football
Warwickshire has no Football League clubs. As of the 2022–23 season the highest-placed team is Leamington, who play in the National League North, the sixth tier of English football. A level below in the Southern Football League Premier Division Central are Nuneaton Borough and Stratford Town. Other clubs include Rugby Town, Bedworth United, Southam United, Racing Club Warwick, Coleshill Town, Atherstone Town and Nuneaton Griff. All of these are affiliated to the Birmingham FA.

Aston Villa, Birmingham City and Coventry City are Football League clubs located within the historic boundaries of Warwickshire, along with National League club Solihull Moors and Southern League Division One Central club Sutton Coldfield Town.

Parkrun 
There are six Saturday morning 5km parkruns in Warwickshire for all ages and abilities: Leamington, Stratford upon Avon, Rugby, Bedworth, Southam and Kingsbury. There are also three Sunday 2km junior events at Stratford upon Avon, Rugby and Warwick.

Cricket
Warwickshire County Cricket Club play at Edgbaston Cricket Ground, Birmingham (historically part of Warwickshire). Notable English players for the side have been Eric Hollies, M.J.K. Smith, Bob Willis, Dennis Amiss, Jonathan Trott, Ian Bell, Moeen Ali and Chris Woakes. Overseas players have included Alvin Kallicharran, Rohan Kanhai, Brian Lara, Allan Donald and Shaun Pollock. In 2014 the club partly severed its links to the county by renaming its Twenty20 side the Birmingham Bears, much to the chagrin of many supporters.

Other grounds in modern-day Warwickshire which have hosted first-class cricket matches are:
Griff and Coton Ground, Nuneaton – 26 matches (most recently 1980)
Arlington Avenue, Leamington Spa – 4 matches (most recently 1910)
Swan's Nest Lane, Stratford-upon-Avon – 3 matches (most recently 2005)
Weddington Road, Nuneaton – 3 matches (most recently 1914)

Gaelic sports
The Warwickshire County Board of the Gaelic Athletic Association (GAA) (or Warwickshire GAA) is one of the county boards outside Ireland and is responsible for Gaelic games in Warwickshire. The county board is also responsible for the Warwickshire inter-county teams. They play their home games at Páirc na hÉireann.

Polo
The Dallas Burston Polo Club is a six-pitch polo club located near Southam.

Water polo
Warwick Water Polo club play in the Midland League, and train in Warwick, Banbury and Coventry.

Freedom of the county
In March 2014 the freedom of the county was bestowed on the Royal Regiment of Fusiliers. The honour was officially bestowed following a parade through Warwick on 6 June 2014.

People

Warwickshire is perhaps best known for being the birthplace of William Shakespeare from Stratford-upon-Avon. Even today, road signs at the county boundary describe Warwickshire as "Shakespeare's County". The county has also produced other famous figures such as Aleister Crowley (from Royal Leamington Spa), George Eliot and Ken Loach (from Nuneaton), Rupert Brooke (from Rugby), and Michael Drayton (from Hartshill). The poet Philip Larkin lived in Warwick (born in nearby Coventry). Folk musician Nick Drake, who recorded for Island records in the late 1960s and early 1970s, lived and died in Tanworth-in-Arden. Frank Whittle the inventor of the jet engine was born in Coventry and was closely associated with Warwickshire, growing up in Leamington Spa, and carrying out much of his work at Rugby.

See also
List of Lord Lieutenants of Warwickshire
List of High Sheriffs for Warwickshire
Custos Rotulorum of Warwickshire – List of Keepers of the Rolls
Warwickshire (UK Parliament constituency) – List of MPs for Warwickshire constituency
2007 Atherstone fire
Warwickshire College
W. W. Quatremain

Notes

References

External links

 Warwickshire County Council 
 Warwickshire College Homepage
 Warwickshire Geological Conservation Group (WGCG)
 The Manor of Hunningham
 Images of Warwickshire  at the English Heritage Archive
 

Warwickshire
Non-metropolitan counties
NUTS 3 statistical regions of the United Kingdom
West Midlands (region)
Counties of England established in antiquity